Imam Abu Hanifa, historically known as Charikar (Persian: چاریکار) but renamed by the Taliban to honor the theologian and jurist of the same name, is the main town of the Koh Daman Valley and the capital of Parwan Province in northern Afghanistan. It has a population of around 171,200, which is majority Tajik populated.

The city lies on the Afghan Ring Road, 69 km from Kabul along the route to the northern provinces. Travelers would pass Imam Abu Hanifa City when traveling to Mazar-i-Sharif, Kunduz or Puli Khumri. Despite the proximity to Kabul, slightly more than half of the land is not built-up. Of the built-up land almost equal parts is residential (37%) as vacant plots (32%) with a grid network of road coverage amounting to 19% of built-up land area. Imam Abu Hanifa City is at the gateway to the Panjshir Valley, where the Shamali plains meet the foothills of the Hindu Kush. Imam Abu Hanifa City is known for its pottery and high-quality grapes.

The city of Imam Abu Hanifa has a total population of 96,039 (2015) and has 4 police districts (nahias) with a total land area of 3,025 hectares. There are total number of 10,671 dwellings in Imam Abu Hanifa City.

History 
In 1221, the Battle of Parvan was fought near Imam Abu Hanifa City, in which Jalal ud-Din with an army of 30,000 with 100,000 auxiliaries defeated a column of 30,000 men of the invading Mongol army to give part of his army enough time to escape into the northern Punjab, and avoid the immediate consequences of the fall of the Khwarezmid Empire.

At the beginning of the 19th century, Imam Abu Hanifa City became a flourishing commercial town of several thousand inhabitants. Imam Abu Hanifa City was the location of major battle during the First Anglo-Afghan War. In 1841 a British garrison was massacred.

During the Soviet–Afghan War, the region around Imam Abu Hanifa City was the scene to some of the fiercest fighting. Some areas around Imam Abu Hanifa City served as a stronghold of the Liberation Organization of the People of Afghanistan (SAMA). Imam Abu Hanifa City was at the frontline between Ahmad Shah Massoud's Northern Alliance and the Taliban who captured Kabul in 1996. In January 1997 the Taliban took control of Imam Abu Hanifa City, but Massoud fought back and recaptured it by July. In August 1999 the Taliban launched an offensive and briefly captured Imam Abu Hanifa City, before Massoud counterattacked and drove them out again.

On 14 August 2011, a team of about six suicide bombers attacked the governor's palace in Imam Abu Hanifa City. The Governor Abdul Basir Salangi survived but 19 people were killed to which the Taliban claimed responsibility.

On 19 May 2020, gunmen opened fire inside a mosque in Imam Abu Hanifa City, killing 11 worshippers and injuring 16 others when they were offering the evening prayer after breaking their Ramadan fast. The Taliban denied their involvement in the attack.

On 26 August 2020, the city was the site of floods that killed at least 92 people.

In August 2021, Imam Abu Hanifa City was recaptured by the anti-Taliban forces in the National Resistance Front of Afghanistan. On 25 August 2021, it was revealed that a delegation of resistance forces in Imam Abu Hanifa City were holding talks with a Taliban delegation and that the Taliban by this point were no longer blocking routes to the nearby Panjshir Valley.

Climate

Imam Abu Hanifa has a humid continental climate (Köppen: Dsa) with hot summers and cold winters. The winter months are much rainier than the summer months in Imam Abu Hanifa City. January is the coldest month, with temperatures averaging .

See also 
 Chaharikar District 
 Parwan Province

References

External links

329 BC
Populated places in Parwan Province
Populated places along the Silk Road
320s BC establishments
Provincial capitals in Afghanistan